McLaughlin Crater is an old crater in the Oxia Palus quadrangle of Mars, located at . The crater was named after Dean B. McLaughlin, an American astronomer (1901-1965). The Mars Reconnaissance Orbiter has found evidence that the water came from beneath the surface  between 3.7 billion and 4 billion years ago and remained long enough to make carbonate-related clay minerals found in layers. McLaughlin Crater, one of the deepest craters on Mars, contains Mg-Fe clays and carbonates that probably formed in a groundwater-fed alkaline lake. This type of lake could have had a massive biosphere of microscopic organisms.

See also 

 2024 McLaughlin, minor planet
 Climate of Mars
 Impact crater
 List of craters on Mars
 McLaughlin (lunar crater)
 Water on Mars

References

Impact craters on Mars
Oxia Palus quadrangle